McLean is an unincorporated community in Fayette County, in the U.S. state of Ohio.

History
The community has the name of James McLean, a landowner who allowed the railroad to build on his land in exchange for the naming rights. A post office called McLean was established in 1888, and remained in operation until 1928. McLean had 51 inhabitants in 1910.

References

Unincorporated communities in Fayette County, Ohio
Unincorporated communities in Ohio